Louanne Sirota, also known as simply Louanne (born January 20, 1970), is an American actress and singer. She played the title role in Annie in the 2nd National Company in Los Angeles in 1979. At the time, she was the youngest ever picked for the role. After her breakthrough in the film Oh, God! Book II, she was nominated for a Saturn Award for Best Actress in 1981. She went on to play Annie again in the 1st National Company in 1981 for which she became the youngest recipient of the Drama-Logue Award for outstanding performance in 1981. She also acted as a wise-beyond-her-years Iowa teenager in the short-lived comedy-drama Two Marriages on ABC. She was seen as herself in the 2006 documentary Life After Tomorrow, about the women who have played orphans in Annie.

Other awards in 1980: 
 Academy of Family Films and Family Television - Best Actress for Oh God Book II
 Film Advisory Board - Award of Excellence for Most Promising Actress for Oh God Book II
 Academy of Science Fiction, Fantasy and Horror Films - Golden Scroll Award of Merit for Outstanding Achievement for Oh God Book II

Filmography

As Louanne
 Chuck Barris Rah Rah Show (TV) (1978) as Louanne
 The Long Days of Summer (1980) (TV) as Sarah
 Oh, God! Book II (1980) (Film) as Tracy Richards
 The Last Song (1980) (TV) as Abby Newman
 Aloha Paradise (1 episode, 1981)
 Mork & Mindy (1 episode, 1981) as Miss Geezba
 The Love Boat (1 episode, 1982) as Lybie Warner
 Seven Brides for Seven Brothers (1 episode, 1983) as Jenny Barrett
 Missing Pieces (1983) (TV) as Valerie Scott
 Two Marriages (2 seasons, 1983–1984) as Shelby Armstrong
 Anything For A Laugh (TV) (Chuck Barris Show) (1986) as Louanne
 True Confessions (1 episode, 1986)
 The Bronx Zoo (1 episode, 1987) as Sandy Gillian
 Cowboy Joe 1987 as Isabelle Tidmunk
 A Night in the Life of Jimmy Reardon (1988) (film) as Suzie Middleburg

As Louanne Sirota
 McBride: It's Murder, Madam (2005) (TV) as Forensics Officer
 Detective (2005) (TV) as Judith Pallacio
 McBride: Requiem (2006) (TV) as Forensics Officer
 Accidentally in Love (2011) (TV) as Mama Crowne

References

External links
 

1970 births
Living people
Actresses from Texas
People from Fort Worth, Texas
20th-century American actresses
21st-century American actresses